The Bermel Escarpment is a snow and rock escarpment,  long, extending from the base of the Ford Massif to King Peak, in the Thiel Mountains. The escarpment drops  from the polar plateau to the ice surface north of these mountains. At its base sits Drake Nunatak. It was named by the Advisory Committee on Antarctic Names after Peter F. Bermel, a cartographer with the United States Geological Survey (USGS). Bermel was co-leader (with Arthur B. Ford) of the USGS Thiel Mountains party which surveyed the mountains in 1960–61, and also leader of USGS Topo East and Topo West, 1962–63, in which geodetic control was extended from the area of Cape Hallett to the Wilson Hills (Topo West), and from the foot of Beardmore Glacier through the Horlick Mountains (Topo East).

See also
 Bermel Peninsula
 Tabor Spur

Further reading
 Gunter Faure, Teresa M. Mensing, The Transantarctic Mountains: Rocks, Ice, Meteorites and Water, P 228

References 

 

Escarpments of Antarctica